Muslim ibn Aqil al-Hashimi was the son of Aqil ibn Abi Talib and a member of the clan of Banu Hashim, thus, he is a cousin of Husayn ibn Ali. The people of Kufa called upon Husayn,  who was on his way to Mecca for the Hajj pilgrimage, to overthrow the Umayyad dynasty. He wanted to confirm the loyalty of the people of Kufa, so he sent his cousin and his ambassador, Muslim ibn Aqil, a famous warrior, to Kufa to observe the situation. He sent a letter to Husayn confirming their loyalty, before knowing that the 30,000 followers that he gained would all betray him for their lives. He was executed by the newly installed governor, Ubayd Allah ibn Ziyad, on the 9th of Zilhaj, 60 AH, and is buried at the back of Great Mosque of Kufa.

Journey to Kufa

Letters from Kufa

Husayn ibn Ali received thousands of letters from people of Kufa stating that they were rejecting their governor and asking him to come and serve as their Imam. One letter in particular contained these words: "We invite you to come to Kufa as we have no Imam to guide us. Through you Allah will unite us on the path of truth". A few days later, the people of Kufa sent an emissary, a special messenger, to Husayn ibn Ali to persuade him to go to Kufa. There followed hundreds of other letters and many special emissaries from the people of Kufa to Husayn ibn Ali.

Receiving so many petitions and messages from Kufa, Husayn ibn Ali decided to send Muslim ibn Aqil, who was a famous warrior, as his emissary to Kufa to study the situation there and report to Husayn ibn Ali.

Muslim's Assignment

He wrote a letter to the people of Kufa and gave it to Muslim ibn Aqil. In this letter Husayn ibn Ali said, "I am sending my cousin and one of the most trusted ones from my family, Muslim ibn Aqil, to report to me about your affairs. If his report agrees with what you have written I will soon be with you. You must be clear of the fact that the Imam is the only one who follows the book of Allah, and serves Allah in all matters and affairs with justice, honesty and truth".

Husayn ibn Ali also told Ibn Aqil: "Muslim, the whole world knows that you are one of the bravest warriors. It is just possible that seeing you in Kufa some people may think that our intention is to fight Yazid. Take your two sons Muhammad and Ibrahim with you. When they see you with such young children, they will know that our intentions are peaceful".

According to reports, Muslim ibn Aqil's sons were so young, that they could not even tie up the buttons of their shirts.

Husayn sent three people with Muslim: Qays ibn Mash'ar, 'Imarah ibn 'Abd Allah al-Saluli, and 'Abd al-Rahman ibn 'Abd Allah al-Azd, in addition to the messenger from Kufa.

In Kufa

Kufans' Pledge of Allegiance
Muslim arrived in Kufa on 5 Shawwal 60 AH/ 9 July 680. He went first to the house of Mukhtar al-Thaqafi, who was highly liked by his people and who later became the person who ordered the murder of Ibn Ziyad.

More than 18,000-30,000 people appeared before Muslim ibn Aqil and enthusiastically pledged their allegiance to Husayn ibn Ali as their Imam and pledged to support Husayn even with their lives. Muslim ibn Aqil, encouraged by this response, reported to Husayn ibn Ali by letter that he should proceed to Kufa.

The governor of Kufa, Nu'man ibn Bashir, was told of Muslim's arrival, but refused to attack him. Ibn Bashir was a mild man and did not want to harm the members of the family of the Prophet, so he did nothing to stop Muslim. Many of the supporters of Yazid saw this lack of action as a sign of weakness and encouraged the caliph to replace Bashir with a stronger man. Yazid then deposed Bashir and replaced him with Ubayd Allah ibn Ziyad. Ibn Ziyad was a resourceful and often cruel politician who spared nothing in order to attain political ends. His strong and ruthless character was exactly what the caliph was looking for in order to gain control in Kufa. Yazid wrote to him, "Go to Kufa, capture Muslim ibn 'Aqil and see what is appropriate to imprison him, send him to exile or kill him."

Governor's Warning
The morning of his arrival in Kufa, Ibn Ziyad gathered the people at the grand mosque. There he delivered a speech warning them against mutiny and promised them generous rewards for conforming.  He said, "Anyone found to be sheltering one of those who scheme against the authority of the commander of the faithful and who does not hand him over will be crucified on the door of his own house".

Searching for Muslim
During this time, Ibn Ziyad was working diligently to discover the hiding place of Muslim. He knew that the people of Kufa were meeting secretly, but he was not able to figure out the location. Ibn Ziyad decided that the best way to find Muslim would be to infiltrate his inner circle. He called upon his servant, Ma'qil, to meet him. He gave Ma'qil three thousand dirhams and ordered him to meet with the Shi'as. He was to tell them that he was a Syrian slave who has just arrived in the country and wanted to hand deliver a donation to Muslim. Ma'qil entered the grand mosque and was introduced to Muslim. Ma'qil then delivered the money and swore allegiance to him.  This servant continued to meet with Muslim in the coming days. No secrets were kept from him, so he kept gathering information, which he then reported back to Ibn Ziyad in the evenings.

Hani's Arrest
With the information from Ma'qil, Ibn Ziyad was able to figure out that Muslim was staying at the house of Hani. The governor gathered some of the friends of Hani and asked why he had not visited in quite a while. They made excuses for him, saying that he had been sick and other similar things. Hani was then summoned by the governor who accused him of harboring Muslim in his house. Hani denied this claim and things got heated. Ibn Ziyad then called in Ma'qil and had him corroborate the story that Ibn Ziyad was trying to paint. At this point, Hani was arrested, beaten in the face with an iron-tipped cane, and thrown into prison and was later executed with Muslim ibn Aqil.

Death
Since several people knew that he was staying with Mukhtar al-Thaqafi, Muslim decided to move from there as a measure of precaution and protection. At the invitation of Hani ibn Urwah, another leading member of the Shia community, he moved to Hani's house. This was done secretly and except for a few people no one knew where Muslim was. Through a spy, Ma'qil, who pretended to be a Shia, Ibn Ziyad found out where Muslim was. Since ibn Ziyad had prior relations with Hani, he called him by trick to his palace and got him arrested and thrown into prison. Muslim got the news of Hani's arrest and not wishing to further endanger the lives of his friends, Muslim and his two sons left Hani's house. He left the children with Shurayb, a judge, and went into the desert to try to get back to Husayn to warn him not to go to Kufa. This was the 7th of Dhul-Hajj. That whole day and the following day Muslim tried to get out of the city. He found all the exits sealed and guarded by Ibn Ziyad's soldiers.

Execution
Historians narrate that Muslim was badly wounded when he entered the court of Ibn Ziyad. His teeth were broken and blood was flowing from all over. Still he entered the court like a 'Lion'. Someone in the court told him to pay respect to Ibn Ziyad because he is the "Amir" (Ruler). Muslim refused and replied that his Amir was only Husayn.

Ibn Ziyad told Muslim that he would be killed and asked him if he had any last wishes. Muslim replied saying, "I owe a debt which should be discharged by selling off my sword and armour. Secondly I want my body to be given a proper burial. Thirdly I want a message sent to Husayn advising him not to come to Kufa." Ibn Ziyad agreed to the first request but refused to do anything about the second and third requests. He then ordered Muslim to be taken to the roof of the palace to be executed and his body thrown to the ground.

Muslim was calm and composed as he was dragged up the steps. He was reciting "Allahu Akbar" until the last moment. Then there was an absolute silence followed by a thud as the head of Muslim was chopped and his body fell to the ground. This was on the 9th of Dhul-Hujja. Immediately after Muslim was killed, Hani ibn Urwah as well was dragged to the roof top and executed.

Ibn Ziyad ordered Muqair ibn Obran al-Ahmari to take him to the palace's roof. They went to the top of the fortress, Muslim was decapitated in front of the people, his head was thrown down first and then followed by his body. Hani was also executed. They were executed in this way in order to intimidate the populace. Ibn Ziyad ordered that the bodies of these two men be dragged by their feet through the streets and marketplaces in Kufa. Muslim's body was then crucified upside down and the heads of Muslim and Hani were sent to Yazid to be displayed on the streets of Damascus.

Muslim bin Aqil's two sons, Muhammad and Ibrahim, were also killed in Kufa.

Legacy
While Muslim was not killed at Karbala, he is counted as one of the martyrs of the battle.

The Shi'ite recommend visiting his grave in Kufa and there are certain prayers that are to be recited there.

On the other hand, there is the mausoleum of Ruqayya bint Ali (Wife of Muslim ibn Aqil) located in Lahore, Punjab, Pakistan.[1]

See also
 Abd al-Rahman ibn Aqil
 Ruqayya bint Ali
 Muhammad ibn Muslim and Ibrahim ibn Muslim
 Hani ibn Urwa
 Ahl al-Bayt

References

External links
Yahussain.info
Al-islam.org
Dartabligh.org
Ezsoftech.com

7th-century Muslims
7th-century Arabs
History of Shia Islam